The Neighborhood Watch is a 2014 American drama, adventure short film written by Christopher Langer. It went on to the 2015 Ohio Independent Film Festival.

Plot
A kid named Elijah meets a young boy named Sam at block party with his father.  Sam tells him about his neighborhood watch and about the training ground for it.  Elijah doesn't seem to care until he visits it with Sam and Lucy.  Lucy likes Sam and goes missing.  Elijah then goes after her by himself.

Cast
Andrew Mittelo as Elijah
Elliot Lockshine as Sam
Anna Jaffe as Lucy
Anthony T. Mittelo as Don
Chris Bohan as John
Lauren Rhodes as Susan
Nick Farrell as Nick
Logan Roberts as Logan

References

External links

2014 films
American drama short films
American independent films
2014 drama films
2010s English-language films
2010s American films
2014 independent films
2014 short films